Jan Minář (born 9 April 1981) is a professional Czech tennis player. His brother Ivo is also a professional player.

Singles finals

Wins (6)

Runners-up (9)

Doubles finals

Wins (2)

Runners-up (3)

External links
 
 

1981 births
Living people
Czech male tennis players
Tennis players from Prague